The Way to the Gold is a 1957 drama film directed by Robert D. Webb and starring Jeffrey Hunter, Sheree North, and Barry Sullivan. It was released by 20th Century-Fox.

Plot
Joe Mundy (Hunter) is being released from prison and an old convict, whom he has befriended, tells him the location of stolen gold. Leaving the prison, Joe is followed to Glendale, Arizona by Little Brother Williams (Neville Brand). There he meets Henrietta Clifford (North), who befriends him after he's badly beaten by Williams. Eventually, Joe and Henrietta go searching for the gold themselves.

Cast
Jeffrey Hunter as Joe Mundy
Sheree North as Henrietta 'Hank' Clifford, waitress
Barry Sullivan as Marshal Hannibal
Walter Brennan as Uncle George Williams
Neville Brand as Little Brother Williams

Production
The film was based on a novel by Wilbur Daniel Steele. In August 1954 Darryl F. Zanuck recommended 20th Century Fox by the screen right prior to publication. (Zanuck had left the studio but still held considerable clout there.) They paid $60,000 even though the novel had not been completed.

The novel was published in July 1955. The New York Times said it "should have real success."

In May 1956 Wendell Mayes was hired to write the script. Mayes later called it "a picture that was before its time, which slipped by quite unnoticed... an interesting picture, but the studio and the people who publicize pictures didn't understand that it was a comedy. They thought that it was a big melodrama, so it slipped by."

Elvis Presley was offered the starring role in the film but 20th Century-Fox refused to pay the $250,000 plus 50% of the profits that Elvis' manager, Colonel Tom Parker was demanding (Fox had offered $150,000 plus 50%).

Filming started January 1957.

Sheree North separated from her husband during filming.

See also
 List of American films of 1957

References

External links

1957 films
Films directed by Robert D. Webb
Films scored by Lionel Newman
Films with screenplays by Wendell Mayes
Treasure hunt films
20th Century Fox films
CinemaScope films
1957 drama films
1950s English-language films
American drama films
1950s American films